Ka Yee Christina Lee is a Professor of Chemistry and the Provost at the University of Chicago, where she succeeded Daniel Diermeier on February 1, 2020. She works on membrane biophysics, including protein–lipid interactions, Alzheimer's disease and respiratory distress syndrome. She is a Fellow of the American Institute for Medical and Biological Engineering and American Physical Society.

Early life and education 
Lee was born in Hong Kong. Lee completed her bachelor's degree in electrical engineering at Brown University in 1986. She joined Harvard University for her graduate studies in applied physics, earning her master's in 1987 and PhD in 1992. She worked under the supervision of Eric Mazur on liquid-vapour interfaces. Lee was a postdoctoral researcher with Harden M. McConnell at Stanford University and with A. J. Waring at the University of California, Santa Barbara.

Research and career 
Lee joined the Department of Chemistry at the University of Chicago in 1998, and was made a full Professor in 2008. She has made significant contributions to the understanding of molecular behaviour in lipid films. She investigates the functionality of lung surfactant, mechanisms of antimicrobial peptides, sealing effects of polymers and recognition of lipids in receptors that regulate immunity. She looks to control biomembranes that can mimic real-life systems to understand Alzheimer's disease and respiratory distress syndrome. Lee uses microscopy, x-ray and neutron scattering to establish the interactions of lipids and proteins.

Lung surfactant, a lipid-protein mixture, forms at the alveolar air-water interface. A lack of surfactant in premature infants can result in infant respiratory distress syndrome (RDS). In an effort to improve interventions for patients with RDS, Lee's research group look to identify the relationships between structure and function in lung surfactant, as well as establishing how the surfactant interacts with nearby proteins. She also studies the role of amyloid beta, a residue generated by the processing of the amyloid precursor protein, and Alzheimer's disease. The Lee group look to establish a model for Ab aggregation, identifying which Ab isoforms are associated with Alzheimer's disease pathology. She has also studied the mechanisms that allow the formation of the myelin sheath. Using transmission electron microscopy, her group studied the self-assembly of myelin lipids into tubules and subsequent transition into lamellar. Using atomic force microscopy the Lee group monitored the interactions of antimicrobial peptides with biomembranes. She demonstrated that peptides share a common interaction which is driven by membrane line tension reduction.

Her research group developed a self-healing gel that works underwater; a synthetic version of the substance that mussels use to anchor to rocks in the ocean. Mussels contain byssal threads, which resist material failure by limiting crack propagation. The Lee group identified ways to control the crosslinking of catechol and Fe3+ using pH. Her group went on to study the mechanical properties of hydrogels regulated by pH, demonstrating it is possible to design a range of synthetic materials using mimicry of mussel proteins.

Lee has also demonstrated that geometric tools can be used to study complex and non-linear biological interfaces. She showed that thin elastic membranes can adopt both periodically wrinkled or folded morphologies. When compression of membranes exceeds one third of their 'wrinkled wavelength', the membranes fold, eventually transforming into a symmetry-broken state that looks crumpled.

Academic service and advocacy 
Lee served as Director of the National Science Foundation Materials Research Science and Engineering Center. Lee is committed to increasing opportunities for women and minority students to take part in scientific research, and regularly hosts students for summer research programs. Lee is an advocate for women in science, and was a founding member of the Chicago Collaboration on Women in Science. The collaboration supports women faculty members in Northwestern University and the University of Chicago.

Lee served as a member of the steering committees of the University of Chicago centres in Beijing and Hong Kong. Lee was appointed Vice provost for Research in August 2018. In that capacity, she worked with faculty and deans to enhance and expand research activities at the University, and oversaw large-scale research structures, including University Research Administration, University of Chicago Consortium for Advanced Science and Engineering(CASE), Office of Research Safety, Research Computing Center and Research Development Support.

Lee was appointed Provost of the University of Chicago on January 7, 2020, and began her term on February 1. On December 9, 2022, she announced that she would be stepping down from the role as soon as a successor could be chosen.

Awards and honors 
 1999 David and Lucile Packard Foundation Fellow
 2001 Margaret Oakley Dayhoff Award
 2007 University of Chicago Llewellyn John and Harriet Manchester Quantrell Award for Excellence in Undergraduate Teaching
 2009 American Physical Society Fellow
 2009 American Chemical Society Astella USA Foundation Award
 2013 American Institute for Medical and Biological Engineering Fellow
 2013 University of Chicago Arthur L. Kelly Faculty Prize
 2013 Phi Beta Kappa Fellow

References 

University of Chicago faculty
Brown University School of Engineering alumni
Harvard University alumni
Stanford University Department of Chemistry faculty
University of California, Santa Barbara faculty
Fellows of the American Physical Society
Living people
Hong Kong people
1964 births